Various singers and bands from countries around the world, including Brazil, Germany, Colombia, Poland, the United States, India and Japan, have released MTV-branded albums after performing on MTV shows, a majority of these coming from MTV Unplugged.  Most of the live albums are released as audio-only or as visual concert performance albums.  Some albums are released as combinations of the two. In Brazil, albums are generally released as Acústico MTV, Luau MTV, or MTV ao Vivo, all different programs from MTV Brasil. MTV has also released compilation albums containing music videos or tracks from the various releases.

Live albums

1990s

2000s

2010s

Video albums

Compilation albums

Live albums

Video albums

Notes
 A  This album, digitally released, also contains a video for "Yo Side of the Bed" as track nine.

External links
 Official website

References

 
Mtv Series Albums